Joseph Hudson Short Jr. (February 11, 1904 – September 18, 1952) was the sixth White House Press Secretary from 1950 to 1952 and served under President Harry S. Truman. Previously, he had worked as Washington correspondent for various media.

Timeline
 1904 (February 11)  Born, Vicksburg, Mississippi  
 1925  A.B., Virginia Military Institute  
 1925-1929  Reporter in Vicksburg and Jackson, Mississippi, and New Orleans, Louisiana  
 1929-1931  Correspondent for the Associated Press, Richmond, Virginia Bureau  
 1931-1941  Correspondent for the Associated Press, Washington, D.C. Bureau  
 1937 (December 27)  Married Beth Campbell  
 1941-1943  Correspondent for the Chicago Sun, Washington, D.C.  
 1943-1950  Correspondent for the Baltimore Sun, Washington, D.C.  
 1950-1952  Press Secretary to the President  
 1952 (September 18)  Died, Washington, D.C

External links

 Joseph H. Short

1904 births
1952 deaths
Truman administration personnel
Virginia Military Institute alumni
White House Press Secretaries